CPRA may refer to: 
 Central progressive retinal atrophy, a type of progressive retinal atrophy (an eye problem) 
 California Privacy Rights Act (a privacy and data protection law)
 California Public Records Act (a freedom-of-information law)